Foster Fitz-Simons (born Albert Foster Fitz-Simons on 30 June 1912 in Atlanta, Georgia; died 16 April 1991 in Raleigh, North Carolina) was an American dancer, novelist, and teacher.  He was a member of the first all-male dance company in the US, Ted Shawn's Male Dancers. He left Ted Shawn's company to form a partnership with Miriam Winslow; they performed together for many years, appearing with the Boston, Detroit, and Toronto Symphonies as well as at the Guild Theatre in New York City and at the Rainbow Room at Rockefeller Center.  They toured South America for five months in  1941.

Fitz-Simons' most notable work as a writer was his 1949 novel Bright Leaf (loosely based on the Duke family and their place in the North Carolina tobacco industry), which became a film starring Gary Cooper and Lauren Bacall in 1950.  Fitz-Simons taught for many years in the Department Dramatic Art at the University of North Carolina at Chapel Hill.

References

External links
https://web.archive.org/web/20041126101515/http://www.bama.ua.edu/~dhughes/flamessite/connections/Fitz/fitzsimmons.html
 http://www.danceinteractive.jacobspillow.org/dance/ted-shawns-men-dancers

American male dancers
20th-century American novelists
1912 births
1991 deaths
American male novelists
University of North Carolina at Chapel Hill faculty
20th-century American male writers
20th-century American dancers